During the 1994–95 English football season, Oldham Athletic A.F.C. competed in the Football League First Division.

Season summary
When Joe Royle quit as Oldham manager to take over at Everton in November 1994, Sharp took over as player-manager at Boundary Park and they finished in midtable in the 1994–95 season – a disappointing showing for a side who had retained all but one of their key players (Mike Milligan) from the side that had been relegated from the Premier League and reached an FA Cup semi-final.  Season highlights were a 3–1 win over local rivals Bolton Wanderers that ultimately cost their neighbours automatic promotion, a 4–1 hammering of promotion chasing Wolverhampton Wanderers on Boxing Day and a 1–0 victory over eventual champions Middlesbrough.

Final league table

Results
Oldham Athletic's score comes first

Legend

Football League First Division

FA Cup

League Cup

Players

First-team squad
Squad at end of season

References

Oldham Athletic A.F.C. seasons
Oldham Athletic